HashTag, stylized as haShtag or HASHTAG, is a seven-member South Korean girl group formed by Luk Factory and produced by Kan Mi-youn. The group debuted on October 11, 2017, with The girl next door.

History

Pre-debut
Dajeong competed in season 1 of Produce 101 as a trainee of Hello Music Entertainment. She was eliminated in episode 5, with her final ranking being 62nd.

2017: Debut with The girl next door
On September 8, 2017 former Baby V.O.X member Kan Mi-youn confirmed that she will be producing a seven-member girl group named HashTag and will debut in October. On October 11, the group's debut EP The girl next door was released. The group started album promotions through a showcase on October 10, then made their broadcast debut on October 13, through Music Bank.

2018: Sub-unit Purple
On September 18, 2018 members Dajeong, Seungmin and Subin debuted as the project trio Purple (퍼플) with the digital single Maemmaeya.

2019: #Aeji #paSsion and "My Style"
The group had a comeback on April 16, 2019 with their 2nd mini album #Aeji #paSsion.

The group came back on October 1, 2019 with their 1st digital single My Style.

Members
Hyunji
Sua
Dajeong — Leader
Seungmin
Subin
Sojin
Aeji

Discography

Extended plays

Singles

Filmography

Music videos

References

South Korean girl groups
2017 establishments in South Korea
Musical groups established in 2017